Jayne Hepsibah Sullivan is a milliner who creates and sells women's headwear and hats to a top drawer clientele such as Camilla Parker Bowles.  Her shop was Hepsibah Hats in Brackenbury Village in Hammersmith.

References

British milliners
British businesspeople in retailing
Year of birth missing (living people)
Living people
Place of birth missing (living people)
People from Hammersmith